Coronato is a surname. Notable people with the surname include:
Bob Coronato (born 1970), American painter and printmaker
José Francisco Coronato Rodríguez (born 1953), Mexican politician and lawyer
Matthew Coronato (born 2002), American collegiate ice hockey winger